Dame Alison Hunter Russell DBE (born 17 June 1958), styled The Hon Ms Justice Russell, is a judge of the High Court of England and Wales.

Early life and education
Russell was born in 1958 in Harrogate to a Scottish family. She was educated at Wellington School, Ayr and the Polytechnic of the South Bank.

Career
Russell was called to the bar at Gray's Inn in 1983. She was appointed a recorder in 2004.

Russell became a member of King's Counselin 2008. She practised at 1GC Family Law in London, specialising in family law and human rights.

Russell was appointed as a judge of the High Court of Justice on 13 January 2014, assigned to the Family Division. She became the first judge to be formally addressed as "Ms Justice".

Russell was made a Dame Commander of the Order of the British Empire in February 2014. She is a member of the Family Justice Council.

In April 2017, the Court of Appeal held that Russell had committed a series of "gross and obvious" irregularities in the way in which she had dealt with alleged contempt of court in a case about the alleged abduction of a child. Russell had imprisoned the father of the child for 18 months, holding that he had been in breach of an order which she had not in fact made, and did not have power to make. In doing so, she had made various serious procedural errors. The Court of Appeal awarded damages for wrongful imprisonment against the Lord Chancellor under the Human Rights Act 1998.

In May 2017, Russell allowed an appeal from a relocation decision of Her Honour Judge Owens in the Family Court at Oxford. However, in December 2017, the Court of Appeal held that Russell's decision was 'both wrong and unjust because of serious procedural irregularity', because the 'main basis on which the appeal was allowed by Russell J arose from a legal argument that had not been raised in the grounds of appeal, had not been addressed by either party, and was in any event incorrect'.

Personal life
Russell lives with her partner Julian Francis in South London.

References

1958 births
Living people
People educated at Wellington School, Ayr
Alumni of London South Bank University
Members of Gray's Inn
Family Division judges
British women judges
Place of birth missing (living people)
Dames Commander of the Order of the British Empire